Bloody Bay may refer to:

 Battle of Bloody Bay, a naval battle
 Bloody Bay, Newfoundland and Labrador, Canada
 Bloody Bay Poison Frog, a species of frog in the family Dendrobatidae
 A village and a bay in the island of Tobago by this name. A legend states that a naval battle took place in 1666.